Leslie Leonard Wothke (November 30, 1938 – November 16, 2022) was an American college basketball coach. He served as head basketball coach for the Winona State University, Western Michigan University and United States Military Academy (Army) programs.

Wothke played at Greenville College in Illinois (now Greenville University), graduating in 1961. After beginning his coaching career at the high school level, he became head coach at National Association of Intercollegiate Athletics (NAIA) program Winona State in 1970. In his first tenure for the Warriors, he led the team to four consecutive Northern Sun Intercollegiate Conference (NSIC) regular season titles from 1972 to 1975.

His success caught the attention of new Illinois head coach Lou Henson, who offered Wothke an assistant coaching role for the NCAA Division I Fighting Illini. After four years under Henson, Wothke was given his first Division I head coaching role at Western Michigan. He spent three seasons at WMU, compiling a 42–41 record and winning a Mid-American Conference regular season championship in the 1980–81 season.

In 1982, Army athletic director Carl F. Ullrich (who had hired Wothke when at WMU) offered him the West Point head coaching position. In eight seasons at Army, Wothke compiled a 92–135 record and in the 1984–85 season was named the Metro Atlantic Athletic Conference Coach of the Year. He resigned in 1990.

Wothke returned to Winona State in 1992, coaching the Warriors for a second tenure. He coached the team for six seasons. His overall record at Winona State was 183–110 in eleven seasons.

Wothke died at age 83 on November 16, 2022 at his home in Olathe, Kansas.

References

External links
Head coaching record @ sports-reference.com
NSIC Hall of Fame profile
Winona State Athletics Hall of Fame profile

1938 births
2022 deaths
American men's basketball coaches
American men's basketball players
Army Black Knights men's basketball coaches
Basketball coaches from Indiana
Basketball players from Indiana
College men's basketball head coaches in the United States
Eastern Illinois University alumni
Greenville Panthers men's basketball players
High school basketball coaches in Illinois
Illinois Fighting Illini men's basketball coaches
People from LaPorte County, Indiana
Western Michigan Broncos men's basketball coaches
Winona State Warriors men's basketball coaches